The Charles A. Hall Three-Decker is a historic triple-decker house in Worcester, Massachusetts.  Built c. 1896, it is a well-preserved example of a triple-decker with Queen Anne styling.  It follows a typical side hall plan, but has a squared front bay that is unusual for that part of the city.  The bay is decorated with bands of cut shingles, and has window overhangs between floors.  The bay is topped by a decorated projecting gable.

The building was listed on the National Register of Historic Places in 1990.

See also
National Register of Historic Places listings in southwestern Worcester, Massachusetts
National Register of Historic Places listings in Worcester County, Massachusetts

References

Apartment buildings in Worcester, Massachusetts
Apartment buildings on the National Register of Historic Places in Massachusetts
Queen Anne architecture in Massachusetts
Houses completed in 1896
National Register of Historic Places in Worcester, Massachusetts